Melinda Bush (born August 5, 1956) is a member of the Illinois Senate for the 31st district. The 31st district spans northern Lake County and includes all or parts of Zion, Round Lake, Round Lake Beach, Gages Lake, Winthrop Harbor, Old Mill Creek, Wadsworth, Lindenhurst, Antioch, Waukegan, Gurnee, Beach Park, Grayslake and Lake Villa.

Illinois State Senator

2012 election
In the general election, Bush faced Joe Neal. She was endorsed by Lieutenant Governor Sheila Simon, Senator Terry Link, Senator Susan Garrett, State Representative Rita Mayfield, the Illinois AFL–CIO, Illinois Education Association, Illinois Sierra Club, Planned Parenthood Illinois Action, Illinois Fraternal Order of Police, the Daily Herald and future general assembly colleague Sam Yingling. On election day, Bush won in a close contest.

Tenure
Her associated representatives are District 61 representative Joyce Mason (D-Gurnee) and District 62 representative Sam Yingling (D-Round Lake Beach).

As of July 2022, Senator Bush is a member of the following Illinois House committees:

 Appropriations - Business Regulations and Labor Committee (SAPP-SBRL)
 Appropriations - Government Infrastructure Committee (SAPP-SAGI)
 (Chairwoman of) Credits, Deductions, and Exemptions Committee (SREV-SRCD)
 Education Committee (SESE)
 (Chairwoman of) Environment and Conservation Committee (SNVR)
 Labor Committee (SLAB)
 Redistricting - Lake & McHenry County Committee (SRED-SRLM)
 Revenue Committee (SREV)
 Revenue - Special Issues Committee (SREV-SRSI)
 Transportation Committee (STRN)

Legislation 
During her tenure in the current 101st General Assembly, Bush has sponsored a number of bills. In 2019, she sponsored the Needle and Hypodermic Syringe Access Program Act, which would allow certain groups to establish and operate a needle and hypodermic syringe access program. The bill was signed into state public law in August 2019.

Shortly before the 2020 U.S. coronavirus outbreak, Bush sponsored legislation in the Illinois Senate that would impose a new fee of $0.10 on each carryout bag from food retail establishments.

In 2020, she introduced a bill that would require prescribers (such as physicians) to offer a prescription to naloxone hydrochloride in certain situations that increase a patient's risk to overdose.

References

External links
Biography, bills and committees at the 98th Illinois General Assembly
By session: 98th
Profile at Illinois Senate Democrats
Campaign website
 

Democratic Party Illinois state senators
Women state legislators in Illinois
1956 births
Living people
People from Grayslake, Illinois
21st-century American politicians
21st-century American women politicians
County board members in Illinois